La Société is a restaurant located on the Mink Mile on Bloor Street, Toronto, Ontario, Canada. It is a French Bistro operated by INK Entertainment and owned by Danny Soberano and Charles Khabouth. The opening night was June 15, 2011, and had celebrity guest attendees, including Stephen Wong of Greta Constantine and Kevin Brauch.

Design
The 1920s Parisian bistro theme of La Société's interior design was done by Munge Leung. It features hand painted windows, burgundy velvet walls, marble floors, a full raw bar and a multi-level, outdoor patio. The restaurant in total can seat more than 300.

Montreal
By late 2012, Khabouth announced plans of opening La Société in Montreal.

The decision to expand La Société outside of Toronto came about somewhat unexpectedly as a consequence of INK Entertainment's larger business strategy of providing unified hospitality services of dining, dancing, and hotel accommodation offered via a stylish boutique hotel brand, which Khabouth had been pushing for years. Realizing INK is still not able to execute such an ambitious plan by itself, Khabouth looked for a partnership, approaching Loews Hotels, whose key individuals Jonathan Tisch and Costa Dimas wanted him to gain more experience outside Toronto and in hotels before going into business with him on larger projects. Thus, they offered to let him open another outlet of his Toronto French restaurant, La Société, in the Loews Hôtel Vogue in Montreal. Khabouth accepted and La Société in Montreal's Loews Hôtel Vogue thus became the first project of INK's newly agreed collaboration with Loews Hotels, a partnership expected to yield many more venues.

References

Further reading
 Pricey Bloor St. a bargain for U.S. retailers | Toronto Star
 Shinan: Tout le monde at La Société | National Post
 Charles Khabouth’s new bistro, La Société, brings 1920s Parisian charm to Bloor Street - Eat - June 2011 - Toronto

External links

French restaurants in Canada
Restaurants in Montreal
Restaurants in Toronto